Elizabethkingia anophelis is a bacterium isolated from the midgut of Anopheles gambiae G3 mosquitoes reared in captivity. The genus Elizabethkingia, named for former US Centers for Disease Control and Prevention (CDC) microbiologist Elizabeth O. King, also includes E. meningoseptica which causes neonatal sepsis and infections in immunocompromised persons, E. endophytica, and E. miricola.

The possibility of a role for mosquitoes in the maintenance and transmission of E. anophelis remains unclear.

Medical importance

A 2014 study showed that some Elizabethkingia infections that had been attributed to Elizabethkingia meningoseptica were instead caused by Elizabethkingia anophelis. E. anophelis has been reported to cause neonatal meningitis in the Central African Republic, and a nosocomial outbreak has been reported in an intensive care unit in Singapore.

An outbreak centered in Wisconsin began in early November 2015, with 48 people confirmed infected in 12 counties and at least 18 deaths by March 9, 2016, and four new cases documented just in the week of 2–9 March 2016. By April 13, 2016, the infection had spread first to western Michigan then to Illinois, with 61 confirmed cases and 21 deaths.

The CDC notes that the infections leading to death occurred in persons over the age of 65 who had other health conditions, leading to uncertainty as to whether E. anophelis was the cause of death, or if the cause was a combination of E. anophelis and preexisting health conditions.

References 

Flavobacteria
Bacteria described in 2011